On October 22, 1984, residents of Edmonton's Ward 6 elected an alderman to replace Bettie Hewes, who had resigned after being elected to the Legislative Assembly of Alberta.

Results

(bold indicates elected, italics indicate incumbent)

References
City of Edmonton: Edmonton Elections

1984
Edmonton municipal by-election
Edmonton municipal by-election
Edmonton municipal by-election